Hans Coray (1906–1991) was a Swiss artist and furniture designer, best known for his 1938 Landi chair.
He was born on 9 June 1906 in Wald, Zurich, and died on 22 November 1991 in Zurich.

He studied Romance languages at the University of Zurich and obtained his doctorate in 1929.

In 1930, he set up as a furniture designer. With Anton Stankowski, Richard P. Lohse, Heiri Steiner, Hans Neuburg, Hans Fischli, Verena Loewensberg, Max Bill and others, he formed a cultural group in connection with the Zurich School of Concrete.

Coray is known for the functionality and simplicity of his designs, and is considered a pioneer of industrial design.

Since 2004, his Landi chair has featured on a series of Swiss postage stamps that has Swiss "design classic" as its theme.

External links 
 
 Short biography with picture

References

1906 births
1991 deaths
Swiss designers